Air-Britain, traditionally sub-titled "The International Association of Aviation Enthusiasts", is a non-profit aviation society founded in July 1948. As from 2015, it is constituted as a British charitable trust and book publisher.

History
Air-Britain was formed in 1948 as an amateur association of aviation enthusiasts. In April 1968, it was incorporated into a company limited by guarantee, Air-Britain (Historians) Ltd. On 16 April 2015, the status of Air-Britain changed from a Private company limited by guarantee, in the form of Air-Britain (Historians) Ltd, to a British charity, in the form of Air-Britain Trust Ltd.

Air-Britain organised an annual international aircraft recognition contest that started with an event in September 1961, for all comers, and attracted applications from individuals and teams from various sources such as Royal Observer Corps (ROC), Air Training Corps (ATC), and Air-Britain regional branches. The annual aircraft recognition contest was discontinued after the 48th event held at Royal Air Force Museum London on 21 November 2009.

Activities
With over 2,500 members worldwide, Air-Britain publishes books about worldwide civilian and military aviation, that are sold via bookshops, air show stands, mail order and via a secure sales website. Two regular journals are published, with coverage of both current and historical aviation themes.

Journals
Aviation World (all aviation) - quarterly
Air-Britain News (current aviation) - monthly
eABN (current aviation) - monthly (electronic magazine version of Air-Britain News)

Events organised
Air-Britain periodically organises events such as international aircraft fly-ins.

Defunct publications
Archived scans of many journals and books are progressively being made available as PDF files on CDs.

Archive (historical civil aviation), 1980 - Dec 2017 (absorbed into Aviation World)
Aeromilitaria (historical military aviation), 1975 - Dec 2017 (absorbed into Aviation World)
British Civil Register News, 1948 - Jun 1953 (renamed British Civil Aviation News)
British Military Serial Numbers, 1950 - Jul 1954 (renamed British Military Aviation News)
Overseas Civil Register News, 1952 - 1957
British Civil Aviation News, Jul 1953 - Dec 1965 (absorbed into Air-Britain Digest)
Overseas Airline News, Jul 1953 - Dec 1963 (absorbed into Air-Britain Digest)
British Military Aviation News, Aug 1954 - Dec 1963 (absorbed into Air-Britain Digest and Aeromilitaria)
Commonwealth Aviation News, Jan 1958 - May 1961 (absorbed into Air-Britain Digest)
European Aviation News, Jan 1958 - Dec 1963 (absorbed into Air-Britain Digest)
Aircraft Movements Review, May 1959 - Dec 1963 (absorbed into Air-Britain Digest)
Air-Britain Digest, 1948 - Dec 2002 (renamed Air-Britain Aviation World)

See also
List of historical societies#List of aviation societies

References

External links
Main website. http://air-britain.com/web/
Sales website. http://www.air-britain.co.uk
ABPIC - a photographic images website accessible to all comers for image uploads and downloads. http://www.abpic.co.uk
AB-IX - members-only e-mail forum for information exchange. https://groups.io/g/AB-IX
Air-Britain Information Exchange - Researchers' Corner. http://www.ab-ix.co.uk/
Air-Britain Message Board. http://air-britain.freeforums.net/
Facebook page. https://www.facebook.com/airbritain/

Charities based in Kent
History of aviation
Educational charities based in the United Kingdom